The 1955 Tampa Spartans football team represented the University of Tampa in the 1955 college football season. It was the Spartans' 19th season. The team was led by head coach Marcelino Huerta, in his fourth year, and played their home games at Phillips Field in Tampa, Florida. They finished with a record of seven wins and two losses (7–2).

Schedule

References

Tampa
Tampa Spartans football seasons
Tampa Spartans football